The men's 3 metre springboard competition at the 2018 Asian Games took place on 31 August 2018 at the Gelora Bung Karno Aquatic Stadium.

Schedule
All times are Western Indonesia Time (UTC+07:00)

Results

Preliminary

Final

References

External links
Official website

Men's 3 metre springboard